Bianca Alicia Kronlöf (born 30 March 1985) is a Sweden-Finnish actress, comedian and screenwriter.

Life
Kronlöf's parents are from Vaasa, Finland; her father is a Swedish-speaking Finn, mother Finnish, maternal grandmother Scottish, and through her maternal grandfather she has Afro-Trinidadian ancestry. Bianca Kronlöf grew up in Nynäshamn and studied at the Stockholm estetiska gymnasium and went on to study at the Teaterhögskolan at Gothenburg University between 2007 and 2011. She has worked as an illustrator for, among others, SIDA and Barnens rätt i samhället better known as BRIS. Kronlöf has also participated in video-art at Liljevalchs konsthall. She is known for her satirical humor and her work for feminism.

In 2012, she garnered attention for her YouTube videos in which she played the role of "Snubben" (the dude) and highlights the subjects of racism and sexism. During her years of studies in Gothenburg, Kronlöf along with two other classmates started the feminist theater group "Gruppen.

In 2013, she was a travelling reporter for the Sveriges Radio and Sveriges Television charity show Musikhjälpen. She travelled to Bangladesh to report on the situation for women in the country. When Kronlöfs comedy show Full patte had its 2014 premiere on SVT Flow, her sister Tiffany Kronlöf also participated in the show.

The paper "Nöjesguiden" labeled Bianca and her sister Tiffany as the "two of the biggest feminist role models in the country". During 2014, Kronlöf participated in the comedy series Hårdvinklat on TV3.

In 2014 and 2015, she had lead roles in two films, the Swedish feature Underdog (Swedish title Svenskjävel) and the Norwegian feature Verden venter. She is also part of the theater play "Gruppen och herrarna!" at Stora Teatern in Gothenburg.

Kronlöf won the Métronews Best Actress award at 2014's Les Arcs European Cinema Festival for her performance in Underdog.

References

Living people
1985 births
Actresses from Stockholm
Swedish film actresses
Swedish stage actresses
Swedish television actresses
People from Nynäshamn Municipality
Place of birth missing (living people)
University of Gothenburg alumni
Swedish people of Finnish descent
Swedish people of Scottish descent
Finnish people of Scottish descent
Swedish people of Trinidad and Tobago descent